The List of Junkers Ju 52 operators lists by country the civil airlines and military air forces and units that have operated the aircraft.

Civil operators
The civil operators was operated airlines

Argentina
Aeroposta Argentina
Líneas Aéreas del Estado (LADE)
Ministry of Agriculture

Austria
Österreichische Luftverkehrs

Belgium
Sabena

Bolivia
Lloyd Aéreo Boliviano

Brazil
Aeronorte
Cruzeiro do Sul
Syndicato Condor - Serviços Aéreos Condor
VASP
VARIG

Canada
Canadian Airways Limited
Canadian Pacific Airlines

China

Eurasia

Czechoslovakia
ČSA Československé aerolinie
Government of Czechoslovakia (Postwar)

Denmark
Det Danske Luftfartsselskab

Estonia
AGO

Finland
Aero Oy
DLL

France
Aero Cargo
Aigle Azur
Air France
Air Nolis
Air Ocean
 Avions Bleus
CTA Languedoc Roussillon
LASO France
Société Auxiliare de Navigation Aérienne
SOCOTRA
Transports Aériens Intercontinentaux

Nazi Germany
Deruluft
Deutsche Lufthansa

Germany
Deutsche Luft Hansa
Lufthansa (one still in used for special flights)

Greece
Elliniki Eteria Enaerion Sinkinonion
EEES operated three Junkers Ju 52/3m. The first arrived on June 28, 1938, with W.Nr.5984 and registration SX-ACF. The other two were SX-ACH (W.Nr.6004) and SX-ACI (W.Nr.6025). All three were used by the Royal Hellenic Air Force during the 1940-41 war against Italy and Germany. All were captured by the Wehrmacht and transferred to the Luftwaffe.

Hungary

Malert

Italy
Ala Littoria

Mozambique
Direccao de Exploracao dos Transportes Aéreos

New Guinea
Gibbes Sepik Airways
Mandated Airlines
Between 1955 and 1959 Gibbes Sepik Airways operated three Ju 52/3ms purchased in Sweden. Mandated Airlines bought Gibbes Sepik Airways in 1959 and continued to operate the two surviving aircraft until the following year.

Norway
Det Norske Luftfartselskap

Poland
LOT Polish Airlines (1 in 1936–1939)

Portugal
Aero Portuguesa

Romania
LARES
Transnistrian air section

South Africa

South African Airways

Soviet Union
Deruluft
Aeroflot

Spanish State

Iberia Airlines

Sweden
AB Aerotransport

Switzerland

Ju-Air (still used, used only 2 Ju 52)

Turkey
Turkish Airlines

United Kingdom
British Airways Limited
British European Airways
British Overseas Airways Corporation
Railway Air Services

Uruguay
Compañía Aeronáutica Uruguaya S.A. (CAUSA)

Yugoslavia
JAT

Military operators

Argentina
Argentine Air Force

Austria
Austrian Air Force

Belgium
Belgian Air Force

Belgian Congo
Force Publique

Bolivia
Bolivian Air Force

Bulgaria
Bulgarian Air Force

Colombia
Colombian Air Force

Croatia

Air Force of the Independent State of Croatia

Czechoslovakia
Czechoslovakian Air Force (postwar)

Ecuador
Ecuadorian Air Force

France
French Air Force (postwar)
French Navy (postwar)

When France was liberated some Ju 52 were captured and used. The Ju 52 had been manufactured in France during the war by the Junkers-controlled Amiot company, and production continued after 1945 as the Amiot AAC 1 Toucan (more than 500 were produced). French built Ju 52s were widely used, not only in France but also in colonial wars in Algeria, Vietnam and Thailand.

Nazi Germany
Luftwaffe

Greece
Hellenic Air Force

Hungary

Royal Hungarian Air Force

Italy

Regia Aeronautica

Norway
Royal Norwegian Navy Air Service: One aircraft rented from DNL from January 1940 to 9 April 1940.
Norwegian Air Force (captured) (postwar)

Peru
Peruvian Air Force

Portugal
Portuguese Air Force

Kingdom of Romania
Royal Romanian Air Force
Romanian Air Force (postwar)

South Africa
South African Air Force

Slovakia

Slovak Air Force (1939–45)

Soviet Union
Soviet Air Force (postwar)

Spanish State

Spanish Air Force

Sweden
Swedish Air Force

Switzerland
Swiss Air Force

Syria
Syrian Air Force (postwar)

United States

United States Army Air Forces
USAAF operated one aircraft known as Junkers C-79.

Yugoslavia
SFR Yugoslav Air Force
1st Transport Aviation Regiment (1944-1948)
119th Transport Aviation Regiment (1948-1966)
81st Support Aviation Regiment (1961-1964)

Notes

References

External links

 South African Airways Museum Society

Junkers Ju 52
Ju 52
Ju 052, operators